Henriette Caroline Devonshire, née Vulliamy, who published as Mrs. R. L. Devonshire (1864-1949) was a French translator and travel writer.

Henriette Vulliamy married the English lawyer Robert Llewellyn Devonshire. They settled in Maadi, a suburb of Cairo, in 1913.

K. A. C. Creswell was a friend and collaborator.

Works
 (tr.) The life of Pasteur by René Vallery-Radot. 2 vols. London: Constable, 1902.
 (tr.) Vols 1 and 2 of Life and Letters of H. Taine by Hippolyte Taine. Westminster: Constable, 1902-4.
 (tr.) Flaubert by Émile Faguet. Boston, New York: Houghton Mifflin Co., 1914.
 Rambles in Cairo, Cairo, 1917
 Some Cairo mosques, and their founders, Cairo, 1921
 (tr.) Relation d'un voyage du sultan Qâitbây en Palestine et en Syrie. Translated from the Arabic. Cairo, 1921.
 Quatre-vingts mosquées et autres monuments musulmans du Caire. Guide des visiteurs, Cairo: De l'institut Français d'Archeologie Orientale, 1925.
 L'Égypte musulmane et les fondateurs de ses monuments, Paris: Maisonneuve Frères, 1926.
 Eighty mosques and other Islamic monuments in Cairo, Paris, 1930. Enlarged from the French edition.
 Quelques influences islamiques sur les arts de l'Europe, Cairo: Imp. E. and R. Schindler, 1935.
 Moslem builders of Cairo, Cairo: R. Schindler, 1943

References

External links
 The indomitable Mrs. Devonshire
 Terry Allen, A Bookplate of Henriette Caroline Devonshire

1864 births
1949 deaths
French translators
French travel writers
French–English translators
Arabic–French translators
British emigrants to Egypt